Bartholina etheliae is a species of plant in the family Orchidaceae. It is widespread in Southern Africa from Namibia down the west coast of the Northern and Western Cape and then along the southern Cape coast as far east as Port Elizabeth. It also is found well into the Karoo.

References

etheliae
Vulnerable plants
Plants described in 1884
Flora of Namibia
Orchids of South Africa
Taxonomy articles created by Polbot